Arunas A. Chesonis is Chairman of the Board and CEO of Sweetwater Energy, a Rochester, New York renewable energy company. His appointment was announced on December 16, 2011.  Chesonis previously served as the chairman of the board, president, and chief executive officer of PAETEC Corp. since May 1998, when he founded the company.  In 2011, Chesonis sold PAETEC to Windstream Communications for $2.3 billion.

Arunas Chesonis is a civil engineering graduate of MIT and holds an M.B.A. from the William E. Simon Graduate School of Business Administration at the University of Rochester. He sits 
on the board of the MIT School of Engineering Dean's Advisory Council (DAC).

References

21st-century American businesspeople
Living people
Place of birth missing (living people)
MIT School of Engineering alumni
University of Rochester alumni
1966 births